The Tjaynera Falls is a waterfall on the Sandy Creek that is located within the Litchfield National Park in the Northern Territory of Australia.

Location and features

See also

 List of waterfalls of the Northern Territory

References

External links
 
 

Waterfalls of the Northern Territory
Litchfield National Park